Kirill Boliukh (born 12 March 2007) is a Ukrainian diver. He won two silver medals at the 2022 European Championships.

Career 
Boliukh made his Ukrainian national team debut in 2021, at the age of 14, when he competed at the Abu Dhabi Aquatics Festival.

At the World Championships in Budapest, he placed together with Oleksiy Sereda 4th in synchronized dives on 10m platform, more than 20 points behind bronze medallists Rylan Wiens and Nathan Zsombor-Murray from Canada, though the Ukrainians were 2nd in the preliminary round.

Boliukh won his first senior medals at the 2022 European Championships in Rome where he finished 2nd in both synchronized dives on 10m platform (together with Sereda) and team event (together with Baylo, Kesar, and Konovalov).

References

External links 
 Boliukh's profile at the website of FINA

Ukrainian male divers
Living people
2007 births
21st-century Ukrainian people